Divine is an adjective related to divinity, the characteristics of a deity.

Divine or Divines may also refer to:

Businesses 
 Divine (corporation), a defunct web services company
 Divine Chocolate, a British-Ghanaian chocolate brand

Films 
 Divine (1935 film), a French drama film
 Divine (1975 film), a French comedy film
 Divine (2020 film), a German-Italian romantic comedy film
 Divines (film), a 2016 French film

Literature 
 The Divine (graphic novel), a 2015 graphic novel by Asaf Hanuka, Tomer Hanuka, and Boaz Lavie
 Divine, a character in Jean Genet's novel Our Lady of the Flowers

Music

Performers 
 Divine (performer) (1945–1988), American actor, singer, and drag queen
 Divine (rapper) (born 1990), Indian rapper
 Divine (group), an American R&B girl group formed in 1996
 Divine Brown (born 1974), Canadian R&B and soul singer
 Divine Styler, stage name of American hip hop artist Mikal Safiyullah (born Mark Richardson in 1968)

Albums
 Divine (Tuxedomoon album) (1982)
 Divine (Blinded Colony album) (2003)

Songs 
 "Divine" (Korn song) (1994)
 "Divine" (t.A.T.u. song) (2005)
 "Divine" (Sébastien Tellier song) (2008)
 "Divine" (Girls' Generation song) (2014)

People 
 Divine (surname), a surname
 Divine (given name), a list of people with the name
 La Divine (English: "The Goddess"), nickname for Suzanne Lenglen (1899–1938), French tennis player
 Father Divine (c. 1876–1965), African-American spiritual leader who claimed to be God
 Estella Marie Thompson (born 1969, aka Divine Brown, prostitute involved in a scandal involving actor Hugh Grant
 Zuzu Divine (born 1994), Mexican professional wrestler
 Anglican divine, a theologian of the Church of England

See also 
 Devine (disambiguation)
 Divination
 Divining rod